The grey-zone (also grey zone, gray zone, and gray-zone) describes the space in between peace and war in which state and non-state actors engage in competition.

Definition

Use of the term grey-zone is widespread in national security circles, but there is no universal agreement on the definition of grey-zone, or even whether it is a useful term, with views about the term ranging from "faddish" or "vague", to "useful" or "brilliant".

The grey-zone is defined as "competitive interactions among and within state and non-state actors that fall between the traditional war and peace duality." by the United States Special Operations Command.

A key element of operations within the grey-zone is that they remain below the threshold of an attack which could have a legitimate conventional military response (jus ad bellum).

One paper defined it as "coercive statecraft actions short of war", and a "mainly non-military domain of human activity in which states use national resources to deliberately coerce other states".

The Center for Strategic and International Studies defines the grey-zone as "the contested arena somewhere between routine statecraft and open warfare."

British Defence Secretary Ben Wallace called the grey-zone "that limbo land between peace and war."

History
The concept of the grey-zone is built on existing military strategies; however, information technology has created radical new spaces which have expanded what is possible. Modern hybrid warfare and political warfare operations primarily occur in the grey-zone.

In the late 2010s, China escalated to grey-zone warfare with Taiwan in an attempt to force unification with the smaller country. Taiwan's Coast Guard Administration has had to expand rapidly to meet the rising grey-zone challenge. China's grey-zone operations against Taiwan in the maritime domain are meant to establish presence while maintaining plausible deniability.

Concerns
It is generally believed that non-democratic states can operate more effectively in the grey-zone as they are much less limited by domestic law and regulation. It can also be very hard for democratic states to respond to grey-zone threats because their legal and military systems are geared towards seeing conflicts through the sense of war and peace with little preparation or consideration for anything in between. This can lead democratic states to either dramatically overreact or under-react when faced with a grey-zone challenge.

Relation with hybrid warfare
The concept of grey-zone conflicts or warfare is distinct from the concept of hybrid warfare, although the two are intimately linked as in the modern era states most often apply unconventional tools and hybrid techniques in the grey-zone. However many of the unconventional tools used by states in the grey-zone such as propaganda campaigns, economic pressure and the use of non-state entities do not cross over the threshold into formalized state-level aggression.

See also
 Gunboat diplomacy 
 Proxy war
 Chinese salami slicing strategy
 Unrestricted Warfare

References

Further reading 

 

International relations